Traci Stumpf is an American TV host, stand-up comedian and actress. She recently hosted the 2016 MTV MIAW Music awards in Mexico City with Fall Out Boy’s bassist Pete Wentz.  She is the host of a new MTV show called GameChanger currently filming in New York, as well working on new shows currently in development with production company DiGa.  Her unique brand of comedic hosting was one of the reasons she was named one of the "Four Comedians You Need to Check Out this Year" by The Sharpe.

Career 
In early 2016 she was the co-host of the MTV International show Bugging Out, a high energy prank show using hidden cameras where technology turns on users with hilarious results. From 2014 to 2016 Stumpf hosted the round table hot topic show Debatable on the YouTube channel Clevver News by Defy Media. In 2014 Stumpf was the nightly host of Yahoo TV's most viewed show TV IN NO TIME and Clevver TV's Totally Clevver, a weekly comedic "man on the street" pop culture show.

References

External links 

 

21st-century American actresses
American women comedians
American stand-up comedians
Living people
1986 births
Actresses from Burbank, California
21st-century American comedians
Comedians from California